This is a list of the known roses of the Australian breeder Alister Clark (1864–1949). It is an attachment to the main page on Alister Clark as a rose breeder. The list of surviving roses has been compiled from Peter Cox's Australian Roses; the online list established by Help Me Find Roses for Clark, Alister; and from the Govanstones' The Women Behind the Roses. Lost roses have been compiled from a press release PDF of the Rose Society of New South Wales when reconciled to the online list established by Help Me Find Roses for Clark, Alister. 'Baxter Beauty' is the sport of an Alister Clark rose, not an Alister Clark rose itself.

In the Extant column of the table, "Yes" means extant in Australia, "Doubtful" means there exists a rose of doubtful authenticity, "Italy" &c means extant only in Italy &c, "Lost" means lost to cultivation.

References

Peter Cox, Australian Roses, Bloomings Books, 1999, pp. 7–18, ; Charles Quest-Ritson, Climbing Roses of the World, Timber Press, 2003, pp. 38–41, 240–2, 
Help Me Find Roses entry for Clark, Alister.